The Electoral district of Bogong was an electorate of the Victorian Legislative Assembly, which existed between 1889 and 1904. It included the area around Beechworth, Victoria.

Members for Bogong

References

See also
 Parliaments of the Australian states and territories
 List of members of the Victorian Legislative Assembly

Former electoral districts of Victoria (Australia)
1889 establishments in Australia
1904 disestablishments in Australia